Silene chalcedonica (syn. Lychnis chalcedonica), the Maltese-cross or scarlet lychnis, is a species of flowering plant in the family Caryophyllaceae, native to central and eastern Russia, Kazakhstan, Mongolia and northwestern China. Other common names include flower of Bristol, Jerusalem cross and nonesuch.

It is a popular ornamental plant in gardens and has gained the Royal Horticultural Society's Award of Garden Merit.

Taxonomy

This plant was first formally named as Lychnis chalcedonica by Carl Linnaeus in 1753. For purposes of taxonomic stability, the genus name Lychnis was formally rejected in 1994 and the name Silene was conserved. The plant is now known as Silene chalcedonica, a name published by Ernst Hans Ludwig Krause in 1901.

The specific epithet chalcedonica refers to the ancient town of Chalcedon in what is now Turkey.

Numerous common names are attached to this plant, including:

Description
The simple, broadly lanceolate leaves are produced in opposite pairs.

The bright red flowers are produced in clusters of 10-50 together. Each flower  in diameter with a deeply five-lobed corolla, each lobe being further split into two smaller lobes. This forms a general shape similar to that of the Maltese cross to which it owes one of its common names. The fruit is a dry capsule containing numerous seeds.

Cultivation and uses

It is a popular ornamental plant in gardens. It has gained the Royal Horticultural Society's Award of Garden Merit. Numerous cultivars have been selected, varying in flower colour from bright red to orange-red, pink or white. It grows best in partial to full sun and in any good well-drained soil, if provided with a constant moisture supply. The flowering period is extended if faded flowers are removed. It is short-lived in poorly drained soil. Double-flowered cultivars are propagated by division.

It was voted the county flower of Bristol in 2002, following a poll by the wild flora conservation charity Plantlife. Its colour is reflected in the livery and crest of the city's university.

As an introduced species
The species has naturalised in some parts of North America. It can be found along roadsides and other disturbed areas, as well as open woodlands, in the northern United States and Canada.

Thomas Jefferson sowed this plant at Monticello in 1807.

References

chalcedonica
Flora of China
Flora of Kazakhstan
Flora of Mongolia
Flora of Russia
Plants described in 1753
Taxa named by Carl Linnaeus